Bülzig is a former municipality in Wittenberg district in Saxony-Anhalt, Germany. Since 1 July 2008, it is part of the town Zahna, which was absorbed into the new town Zahna-Elster on 1 January 2011.

Geography

Bülzig lies about 7 km northeast of Lutherstadt Wittenberg. Bülzig is an Ortsteil (division) within the Ortschaft (locality) Zahna of the town Zahna-Elster.

Economy and transportation
Bülzig is connected to Federal Highway (Bundesstraße) B 2, which lies 6 km west of the community, and joins Berlin and Wittenberg.

Notable people 
 Reiner Haseloff (born 1954), politician

References

Former municipalities in Saxony-Anhalt
Zahna-Elster